Susan Barker  (born 19 April 1956) is an English former television presenter and professional tennis player. During her playing career, Barker won 15 WTA Tour singles titles, including a major singles title at the 1976 French Open. She reached a career-high singles ranking of world No. 3.

Barker started working for the BBC as a tennis presenter in 1993, and the following year began to present coverage of the Wimbledon tennis championships; she stepped down from this role after the 2022 Wimbledon Championships. Barker was a former presenter of A Question of Sport.

Early life
Barker was born on 19 April 1956 and raised in Paignton, Devon, and educated at a convent school. In 1966, aged 10, she was picked out as the second of two girls who were to receive tennis coaching from Arthur Roberts, who had coached Angela Mortimer to three Grand Slam titles. 

Roberts continued coaching her beyond the selection prize commitment, charging only £1/session to allow her development to continue. Barker's forehand was her strongest and most admired weapon throughout her career, with Roberts describing it as "especially potent". 

Advised as a teenager by a visiting LTA coach to change her forehand, Roberts told her not to and he later resigned from the LTA Coaches Association in protest at the advice. Roberts later entered Barker into tournaments on the continent, providing her with a one-way ticket there and telling her to "earn your ticket home". Roberts remained Barker's mentor throughout her career.

Tennis career
Aged 16, and ranked 21st in the WTA rankings, Barker was advised by Roberts to move to the United States for her development. Signed by Mark McCormack's International Management Group (IMG) on her 17th birthday, she moved to an IMG-provided townhouse in Newport Beach, California, where her neighbours included the newly retired Rod Laver, and was coached at the John Wayne Tennis Club.

In 1973 and 1974 she won the Exmouth Open at Exmouth, Devon, on both occasions against Annette Coe. In 1975, Barker won her first top-level singles title and three additional titles. Barker reached her first Grand Slam semi-final in 1975 at the Australian Open. She won the German Open in 1976, beating Renáta Tomanová of Czechoslovakia in the final 6–3, 6–1.

Later in 1976, Barker had the biggest victory of her career by winning the French Open at the age of 20, again defeating Tomanová in the final. After her French Open victory against Tomanová, Barker felt that it would be the first of a number of Grand Slam titles that she would win, but she would not reach another Grand Slam final in her career.

In 1977 Barker won two singles titles in San Francisco and Dallas. She beat Martina Navratilova to reach the Virginia Slims Tour Championships final, where she lost in three sets to Chris Evert. Barker reached the Australian Open semi-final for the second time in 1977 and reached the Wimbledon semi-final that year. She looked set to meet Virginia Wade in the Wimbledon final in 1977, but unexpectedly lost her semi-final against Betty Stöve of the Netherlands.

Years later, Barker said that losing to Stöve was the biggest disappointment of her career and admitted that she was so upset at losing in the 1977 Wimbledon semi-final that she could not bear to watch the final, which was won by Wade.

After an injury-plagued 1978 during which her ranking dropped to World No. 24, she won three singles titles and reached three other finals in 1979. She was named the tour's "Comeback Player of the Year" by her fellow professionals. Barker reached one final in 1980 and won the last singles title of her career at the Brighton International in 1981, finishing the year ranked World No. 16. She won her last doubles title in 1982 at Cincinnati and played her last professional match in 1984.

Barker won 15 singles titles and 12 doubles titles, with wins over Chris Evert, Martina Navratilova, Billie Jean King, Evonne Goolagong, Tracy Austin, Virginia Wade, Maria Bueno, Rosemary Casals, Andrea Jaeger and Pam Shriver. In 2004, recalling her French Open win of 1976, Barker said "I'm still incredibly proud of what I achieved."

Major finals

Grand Slam finals

Singles (1 title)

Year-end championships finals

Singles (1 runner–up)

Doubles (1 runner–up)

WTA Tour finals

Singles: 31 (15–16)

Doubles: 30 (12–18)

Performance timelines

" * " – Barker received a bye in the first round.
 " ^ " – Barker withdrew prior to the match, which is not counted as a loss.

Singles

Doubles

Mixed doubles

Fed Cup

Broadcasting career

After retiring as a tennis player, Barker became a commentator and sports reporter for Australia's Channel 7 in 1985 before anchoring tennis coverage for British Sky Broadcasting from 1990 to 1993. In 1993, Barker joined the BBC and hosted its Wimbledon coverage as a regular guest on Today at Wimbledon with Harry Carpenter. She took over as host of Today at Wimbledon in 1994, and from 2000 until 2022, she anchored the two-week-long broadcast for the network.

Barker has branched out since joining the BBC, becoming one of their chief sports presenters. She was one of the presenters of Grandstand and the presenter of the long-running sports quiz show A Question of Sport (QoS) since 1997, having succeeded David Coleman. She retired as QoS presenter following the BBC's decision to revamp the show, having recorded her last episode in September 2020. She was a host of the annual BBC Sports Personality of the Year awards ceremony from 1994 to 2012 before stepping down in 2013.

Barker has hosted BBC Sport's coverage of the Australian Open, the French Open, Queens Club Championships, Eastbourne, the Davis Cup, the ATP World Tour Finals and Wimbledon.

Other sporting events she has hosted have included the Grand National (2000–2007), the Derby (2001–2007), Racing at Ascot and Longchamp (1995–1999), Hennessy Gold Cup at Newbury, the Great North Run, World Athletics Championships and European Athletics Championships (1999–2009), BBC Sports Personality of the Year (1994–2012), Commonwealth Games (1994–2010), Summer Olympics (1996–2012) and Winter Olympics (1994–2010).

Barker provided commentary for the 1998 video game Actua Tennis, along with fellow BBC broadcaster Barry Davies.

In June 1999, she co-presented coverage of Prince Edward's wedding to Sophie Rhys-Jones at Windsor alongside Michael Buerk. Barker had introduced Rhys-Jones to Queen Elizabeth II's youngest son at a charity function a few years earlier.

In 2008, Barker and the BBC extended her contract to cover the London 2012 Summer Olympics. It was estimated to be worth £375,000 a year.

In July 2012, the Advertising Standards Authority in the UK received over 40 complaints for a Go Compare advert featuring Barker who was shown firing a large rocket launcher at opera singer Gio Compario (Wynne Evans) in an attempt to kill off the face of the brand. A spokesperson for the ASA said: "Some people think it offensive especially at a time when children are watching. Others think it inappropriate when our security forces are coming under fire on a daily basis. As with all complaints, we are looking into the matter before deciding if we launch a full investigation."

Barker was appointed Member of the Order of the British Empire (MBE) in the 2000 New Year Honours for services to sport and broadcasting, Officer of the Order of the British Empire (OBE) in the 2016 New Year Honours for services to broadcasting and charity and Commander of the Order of the British Empire (CBE) in the 2021 Birthday Honours for services to broadcasting and charity.

In September 2020, it was announced that Barker would step down from her role as host of BBC game show A Question of Sport after 24 years; she stated that she was "sad to say goodbye". On 9 June 2022, Barker announced she would be stepping down from BBC coverage of the Wimbledon tennis championship after the 2022 finals, which she had covered since 1993. 

Barker has since stated that she was dismissed from the show rather than leaving by choice. She alleges that she was asked to put her name to an untrue pre-prepared statement claiming she left of her own accord when this was not the case. Barker accepted the BBC's decision to replace her, which she claimed was because they wished to "refresh" the show. However, she criticised the BBC's handling of the matter, describing this as "insulting" and saying that she felt "slightly damaged" by the experience.

Personal life
At 17 years of age, Barker moved to California. In 1978, she broke off an engagement with Australian tennis player Syd Ball. In an interview the following year, she said: "I realised that Syd wasn't the answer. Underneath, I wasn't happy and I certainly wasn't ready for marriage. I wasn't fair to him or myself." After her engagement was broken off, she had a brief relationship with golfer Greg Norman.

In 1980, Barker was temporarily blinded in her right eye after a large dog in Spain jumped up and bit her. She lost the sight in her eye for five hours and feared that the dog attack would force her to stop playing tennis, which she said "broke her heart".

In 1982, Barker met singer Cliff Richard. Their four-month-long romance attracted considerable media attention after Richard flew to Denmark to watch her play in a tennis match and they were photographed cuddling and holding hands at Wimbledon. In 1988, Richard said of his former romance with Barker: "We were closer than just friends. She's the only person with whom I've had that sort of relationship." He said that one of the things which made up his mind not to marry her was when she got upset because he hadn't told her who he was seeing that day. Richard said: "I suddenly realised that in a marriage you don't live for yourself." Richard said in 2008 that he had come close to asking her to marry him. He said: "I seriously contemplated asking her to marry me, but in the end I realised that I didn't love her quite enough to commit the rest of my life to her."

In 1986 some time after Barker's romance with Richard had ended and she began a brief relationship with tennis player Stephen Shaw, Richard said that he was still a friend of Barker. He said: "We have a mutual respect for each other and that means a lot to me."

In 1988, Barker married landscape gardener and former policeman Lance Tankard. They live in the Cotswolds village of Stanton, Gloucestershire, after moving from a mansion on a 26-acre estate in Godalming, Surrey.

In an interview in 1999, Barker said that during her tennis career she was approached by a lesbian tennis player in the locker room and touched "in a way that didn't feel right". Barker refused to name the female tennis player involved.

In September 2022, Barker featured on Desert Island Discs; Her favourite chosen track was "Harry Hippie" by Bobby Womack, with her choice of book and luxury item given as All In by Billie Jean King and some New Zealand sauvignon blanc wine respectively.

Barker's autobiography, Calling the Shots, was published in September 2022.

See also
 Table of all female tennis players who reached at least one Grand Slam final

References

External links 
 
 
 
 

1956 births
Living people
Australian Open (tennis) junior champions
BBC sports presenters and reporters
English autobiographers
English female tennis players
English game show hosts
English sports broadcasters
English television presenters
French Open champions
Grand Slam (tennis) champions in girls' singles
Grand Slam (tennis) champions in women's singles
Commanders of the Order of the British Empire
People from Paignton
Tennis people from Devon
British female tennis players
Tennis commentators
Women autobiographers